The Cornwall City Council is the governing body for the city of Cornwall, Ontario, Canada. The council consists of the mayor and ten councillors. The mayor is elected via a first-past-the-post system while the councillors are elected via a blanket election where each voter can vote for 10 councillors, and the 10 councillors with the most votes are elected to the council.

2010-2014 
Bob Kilger, mayor
Denis Carr, councillor
Bernadette Clément, councillor
Maurice Dupelle, councillor
Syd Gardiner, councillor
Glen Grant, councillor
Elaine MacDonald, councillor
David Murphy, councillor
André Rivette, councillor
Leslie O'Shaughnessy, councillor - resigned in 2012 and was succeeded by Gerald Samson in a by-election
Gerald Samson, councillor
Denis Thibault, councillor

2014-2018

Elected on October 27, 2014, the 2014-2018 council will entered office on November 30, 2014.

Leslie O'Shaughnessy, mayor
Bernadette Clement, councillor
Claude E. Macintosh, councillor
Elaine MacDonald, councillor
Justin Towndale, councillor
Maurice Dupelle, councillor
David Murphy, councillor
Carilyne Hebert, councillor
Brock Frost, councillor 
Mark A. Macdonald, councillor
André Rivette, councillor

2018-2022
Elected October 22, 2018.

Bernadette Clement, mayor - resigned on June 22, 2021 and was succeeded via council appointment by Glen Grant as interim mayor 
Justin Towndale, councillor
Elaine MacDonald, councillor 
Carilyne Hébert, councillor
Maurice Dupelle, councillor
Claude McIntosh, councillor
Eric Bergeron, councillor
Glen Garry Grant, councillor
Dean Hollingsworth, councillor
Todd Bennett, councillor
Denis Carr, councillor

2022-2026
Elected Monday, October 24, 2022. Took office November 15.

Justin Towndale, mayor
Todd Bennett, councillor
Maurice Dupelle, councillor
Syd Gardiner, councillor
Sarah Good, councillor
Carilyne Hébert, councillor
Dean Hollingsworth, councillor
Elaine MacDonald, councillor
Claude E. McIntosh, councillor
Fred Ngoundjo, councillor
Denis Sabourin, councillor

References

External links 
 Cornwall City Council

Cornwall, Ontario
Municipal councils in Ontario